Heinz Fahnler (10 August 1942 – 17 September 2008) was an Austrian football referee.

Refereeing career
Fahnler passed his referee exam in 1962, and in 1976 he became a referee in the Austrian Football Bundesliga. Two years later, Fahnler was appointed as a FIFA referee.

In 1984, Fahnler was selected as a referee for UEFA Euro 1984, where he officiated a group stage match between Portugal and Romania.

Fahnler served as a UEFA delegate from 1990 until 2008, when he suffered a heart attack and died in Madrid before his role as a delegate for the UEFA Champions League match between Real Madrid and BATE Borisov.

References

External links
 Profile at worldfootball.net

1942 births
2008 deaths
Sportspeople from Vienna
Austrian football referees
UEFA Euro 1984 referees